Harold Oliver (1863–?) was an English footballer who played in The Football League for West Bromwich Albion.

References

1863 births
English footballers
West Bromwich Albion F.C. players
English Football League players
Year of death missing
Association football defenders